Waterland is a municipality in the Netherlands.

Waterland may also refer to:

 Waterland (novel), a novel by Graham Swift
 Waterland (film), a 1992 film starring Jeremy Irons
 Daniel Waterland (1683–1740), English theologian

See also
Land and Water Conservation Fund
Land and Water